IN Group is a French company specialized in the production of secure documents such as identity cards and passports, which it designs and sells to various governments and companies. It is the continuation of the Imprimerie Nationale ("National Printing Office") of the French government, whose history dates back to the printers granted special royal privileges during the French Renaissance. It was partially privatized in 1993, operating with fewer government monopolies, more exposure to competition, and more freedom to chart its own business decisions but with all equity continuing to be held by the French government. Since August 2009, the IN Group's CEO has been Didier Trutt. The company slogan is "The Right to Be You".

History
Succeeding the "Printer of the King" and "Printers of the King for the Greek Language" named by Francis I in the 1530s and 1540s during the French Renaissance, the "Royal Imprimery" or "Printing Office" was founded by Louis XIII in 1640 at the instigation of Cardinal Richelieu. Following the French Revolution, it became the "Imprimery of the Republic"; following the coronation of Napoleon, the "Imperial Imprimery"; and following the Bourbon Restoration, the "Royal Imprimery" again. Finally, in 1870, the Third Republic settled on its current name, the "National Imprimery".

The  has long been the exclusive printer for the state, until the law of 1994 which made it a limited company with the state as sole shareholder.

The  was also known to retain a unique collection of punches, a printing workshop, and a printing historical library. It possesses also numerous resources for the history of European printing, such as original documents of the Didot family.

The printing firm carries on the official printing works of several nations around the world (130 commercial partners), like Lebanese passports in addition to the French ones.

In the 2010s, the company's strategy was radically changed and oriented towards production of secure documents and provision of distant security solutions. In 2019, traditional printing only accounts for 5% of the group's total income.

Chronology

1538 : François I grants Conrad Néobar the title of "imprimeur du Roy" for Greek printing.
1540 : Robert Estienne was named "imprimeur du roi pour le grec". Claude Garamond created the typeface "Grecs du roi".
1640 : Louis XIII, advised by Richelieu, created the Manufacture royale d'imprimerie in the Louvre Palace.
1670 : Jean-Baptiste Colbert began the collection « Le Cabinet du Roi ».
1749 : the first volumes of the Histoire naturelle of Buffon were printed.
1790 : the Imprimerie royale became the Imprimerie du Louvre.
1792 : the Imprimerie nationale executive left the Louvre, where it had been since 1640.
1795 : the hôtel de Penthièvre housed two official printing establishments named Imprimerie de la République.
1809 : the Imprimerie impériale was installed at the hôtel de Rohan. There were printed the first 23 volumes of the Description de l'Égypte.
1813 : publication of the decree authorising the section of oriental compositors.
1870 : the Imprimerie impériale became once more the Imprimerie nationale, a name which it still bears.
1900 : for Ambroise Vollard the Imprimerie nationale printed the first "artist's book". An edition of Paul Verlaine illustrated by Pierre Bonnard was also printed.
1903 : the foundation stone of the new works on the plain of Javel.
1910 : the Imprimerie nationale was put in the charge of the Minister of Finance.
1921 : the Imprimerie nationale occupied the premises at the rue de la Convention.
1961 : publication of the decree of 4 December on the organization of the Imprimerie nationale.
1974 : the Imprimerie nationale opened its site de Douai.
1992 : inauguration of the works at Bondoufle by Michel Charasse, minister of the Budget.
1994 : the Imprimerie nationale became Imprimerie nationale SA the whole capital of which was held by the state.
1995 : issue of the first CDROM planned by the Imprimerie nationale.
1997 : acquisition of the firms Saqqarah International, Istra, and Mizeret and creation of "groupe Imprimerie nationale"; acquisition of the firm IDC.
1997 : creation of workshops for production of plastic cards.
1998 : installation of a new press, "la presse dix couleurs", on the Paris site.
2000 : the group member IDC, specialising in digital printing, became INumeric.
2001 : the group member Mizeret became J. Print.
2001 : installation of a KBA rotary press, 64 pages of A4 in four colours at Bondoufle.
2003 : the Parisian buildings on the Convention site were sold to Groupe Carlyle for 85 million euros, then repurchased in 2007 for 376,5 million euros, for the Ministère des Affaires étrangères. The commercial property were sold to a French editing firm.
2005 : the state sold the sites at Bondoufle and Schiltigheim, closed the Parisian rue de la Convention's site, and installed the printing on paper works at Choisy-le-Roi.
2006 : the paper division at Choisy-le-Roi was put under the management of IN Choisy.
2008 : the paper division and the building at Choisy-le-Roi were given up
 2000: production of smartcards
 2002: the Imprimerie Nationale becomes the trusted operator responsible for managing the French tachograph cards.
 2006: production of electronic passports
 2008: production of biometric passports
 2009: production of SIV vehicle registration certificates
 2011: production of European residence permits
 2012: production of electronic European driving licenses
 2017: production of French construction professional identification cards
 2021: production of French national electronic identity cards

References

Citations

Bibliography 
 Bernard, Auguste-Joseph. – Notice historique sur l’Imprimerie nationale. – Paris, Dumoulin, 1848. In 32, 128 p. Portrait de Gutenberg.
 Bernard, Auguste-Joseph. – Histoire de l’Imprimerie royale du Louvre, suivie d’un catalogue chronologique des publications (1640 – An III). – Paris, Imprimerie impériale, 1867. In-8°, XII-311 p. (Reprod. en fac-sim. : Amsterdam : P. Schippers, 1966. 23 cm, X-311 p., index.)
 Christian, Arthur. – Débuts de l’imprimerie en France. L’Imprimerie nationale. L’Hôtel de Rohan. Préface de Jules Clarétie. – Paris, Imprimerie nationale, 1904. In-8°, XXIV-345 p., ill.
 Duprat, François-Antoine-Brutus. – Précis historique sur l’Imprimerie impériale et ses types, par F.-A. Duprat. – Paris, Librairie orientale de Benjamin Duprat, 1848. In-8°, VIII-158 p.
 Duprat, François-Antoine-Brutus. – Histoire de l’Imprimerie impériale de France, suivie des spécimens des types étrangers et français de cet établissement. – Paris, Imprimerie impériale, 1861. In-8°, IV-578 p.
 Grinevald, Paul-Marie, « Publications et collections de l’Imprimerie nationale », Histoire de l’édition française, Paris, Promodis, 1985. Tome 3, p. 208-209.
 Grinevald, Paul-Marie, « Richelieu et l’Imprimerie nationale », Richelieu et le monde de l’esprit, Paris, Imprimerie nationale, 1985, p. 237-248.
 Grinevald, Paul-Marie, « L’Imprimerie nationale », Histoire de l’édition française, Paris, Promodis, 1986. Tome 4, p. 170-171.
 Grinevald, Paul-Marie, « La bibliothèque de l’Imprimerie nationale », Art et métiers du livre, juin 1987, no 145, p. 56-62, ill.
 Grinevald, Paul-Marie, « Les caractères orientaux et l’orientalisme à l’Imprimerie nationale », Art et métiers du livre, décembre 1990, no 165 (Acte du colloque : Le Romantisme typographique.)
 Grinevald, Paul-Marie, « L’art du livre à l’Imprimerie nationale », Métiers d’art, 1990, no 43, p. 85-91, ill.
 Grinevald, Paul-Marie, « L’Imprimerie nationale », Le XVe arrondissement, Paris, Délégation à l’action artistique de la Ville de Paris, 1996, p. 214-217, ill. (Sur la construction de son usine, 1903–1910).
 Grinevald, Paul-Marie, « Le Cabinet des poinçons de l’Imprimerie nationale », Art et Métiers du Livre, novembre-décembre 1996, no 200, p. 46-49, ill.
 Grinevald, Paul-Marie, « Les éditions orientalistes de l’Imprimerie nationale au XIXe siècle », Le livre et l’historien, Études offertes en l’honneur du Professeur Henri-Jean Martin, Genève, Droz, 1997, p. 795-804. (Histoire et civilisation du livre 24.)
 Grinevald, Paul-Marie, « Les Grecs du Roi », Graphê, janvier 2004, no 27, p. 2-5, ill.
– « Histoire de l’Imprimerie nationale », Art et Métiers du Livre, novembre-décembre 2004, n° 245, p. 46-59, ill.
 Willemetz, Geneviève, Jean Anisson 1648-1721: un homme d’affaires et de culture au Grand siècle. Avant-propos, notes, bibliographie et index par Paul-Marie Grinevald. Paris, éditions des Cendres, 2004. 14 × 21,5 cm, 206 p.

External links

 IN groupe official website
 Le site du collectif de défense du patrimoine de l'IN

Printing companies of France
Manufacturing companies based in Paris